The Winstock Country Music Festival is a two-day country music festival that is held in Winsted, Minnesota, United States. The festival usually draws 12,000-15,000 people each day and is usually held in the first two weeks of June. It is often considered to be the first major country music festival of the summer in the upper Midwest.

History

The Winstock Country Music Festival was started in 1994 by a group of Holy Trinity School and Parish boosters. It was to be a fundraiser for the school and parish. The first Winstock was held at the Winsted Municipal Airport and one of the headliners was local country star Paulette Carlson. 

Since then, Winstock has grown and moved across the road to land the festival now owns. Camping and reserved seating are often available at this new location. A second stage was added in 2005 known as the emerging artist stage and has featured rising talent such as Keith Anderson, Little Big Town, and Sugarland.  Notable performers at Winstock have included Montgomery Gentry, Reba McEntire, Brad Paisley, Brett Eldredge, Brooks and Dunn, Martina McBride, Lee Brice, Gary Allan, and Blake Shelton.

See also
List of country music festivals
Country music

References

External links
Winstock Country Music Festival home page

Folk festivals in the United States
Music festivals established in 1994
Country music festivals in the United States
Music festivals in Minnesota
Tourist attractions in McLeod County, Minnesota